The Omega x Swatch MoonSwatch, or simply MoonSwatch, is a collection of 11 chronograph wristwatches produced by Swatch (company of Swatch Group) released on 26March 2022. The watches have a  diameter and  thickness, and Super-LumiNova for the indexes and hands, which is the same lume as that used in the Omega Speedmaster. It has a quartz ETA movement. Initial hype from the watch's release led to long queues in Australia, Canada, Italy, Japan, Switzerland, and the United Kingdom. Each consumer was initially limited to 2 watches but due to high demand that was later reduced to a limit of 1.

Reception 

The watch was well-received by the majority of collectors and the industry. According to CEO Nick Hayek of Swatch Group, the release of the collaboration also boosted sales of the original Omega Speedmaster by roughly 50%.

References

Omega watches
The Swatch Group
2022 establishments
Strategic alliances